Bi Zanuiyeh (also Romanized as Bī Zanū’īyeh; also known as Bīsū’īyeh) is a village in Siyah Banuiyeh Rural District, in the Central District of Rabor County, Kerman Province, Iran. At the 2006 census, its population was 99, in 31 families.

References 

Populated places in Rabor County